Trevor Freeman Horne  (30 September 1920 – 3 July 1991) was a New Zealand politician. He served as mayor of Nelson from 1968 to 1971.

Early life and family
Horne was born in Christchurch. He was the son of Freeman Horne and Mable Smith. He was educated at Gisborne Boys' High School. In 1951 he married Ngaire Johnston and they had two children, a boy and a girl.

Career 
He began work in 1935 as a clerk with a public accountant, joined the Farmers Co-op in 1936, and in 1937 became an apprentice cabinet maker. After the Second World War he formed his own tourism business and was a director of Tourist Services Limited.

War service 
Horne joined the Royal New Zealand Air Force in 1940, serving in No 2 Ground Reconnaissance Squadron as an Acting Flight Sergeant. He left the Air Force in 1946. During the war he studied a Canterbury University commerce course.

Political career 
Horne was elected to the Nelson City Council in 1956, became Mayor for one term from 1968 to 1971 replacing Douglas Strawbridge, and Deputy Mayor from 1974 to 1980. During his time as mayor the Government sought to demolish the old Nelson Provincial Council building to make way for a new court house. Horne and fellow Council member Sonja Davies unsuccessfully campaigned to have the building preserved. The majority of councillors did not support them and in September 1969 the building was demolished.

Public service 
He was a member of Jaycees, Lions, Toastmasters and the Nelson Chamber of Commerce. Horne was also President of the Nelson Judo Kwai and Nelson Skating Club.

In the 1979 New Year Honours, Horne was appointed a Companion of the Queen's Service Order for public services. In 1990, he was awarded the New Zealand 1990 Commemoration Medal.

When he died in 1991, Horne bequeathed $60,000 to the Nelson City, which was used to develop the Trevor Horne Heritage Trail.

References 

1920 births
1991 deaths
Mayors of Nelson, New Zealand
Deputy mayors of places in New Zealand
Companions of the Queen's Service Order
People from Christchurch
New Zealand military personnel of World War II
20th-century New Zealand politicians
People educated at Gisborne Boys' High School
Royal New Zealand Air Force personnel